Changi Bay is a planning area located in the geographical region of Tanah Merah in the East Region of Singapore. The planning area is bordered by Changi to the west and the South China Sea to the east, north and south. This planning area also includes the South China Sea island of Pedra Branca.

The area encompasses 1.7 square kilometres, and with the exception of the two islands, consists entirely of reclaimed land. Despite its remote location, it is the site of installations like the Changi Naval Base, Navy Museum and SAF Yacht Club (Changi). There are no residents permanently living in the area and there are also currently no plans for permanent residential settlement in that area. There is only one public transport option in the area, which is bus service 35. The Coastal Park Connector which connects East Coast Park to Changi Beach Park cuts through and runs along almost the entire perimeter of the area. Access to the two offshore islands are restricted.

The area falls under the jurisdiction of the Bedok Police Division and the 2nd Singapore Civil Defence Force DIV HQ.

Incidents
Tanah Merah Coast Road and the now defunct Changi Coast Road are notorious road stretches that have seen numerous vehicle accidents as a result of the long, straight nature of these roads, and thus motorists have been known to speed up in the area. The traffic police has announced plans in 2018 to install new generation average speed cameras, that takes down the time and distance a vehicle has travelled, to calculate the average speed a vehicle has been travelling across that stretch of road.

 On 21 August 2017, USS John McCain a US guided-missile destroyer was involved in a collision with the merchant ship Alnic MC north of Pedra Branca in Singapore territorial waters, which resulted in the deaths of ten of her crew, and left another five injured. The destroyer was subsequently berthed at Changi Naval Base from 1.30pm of that day till 5 October 2017 where it was then transported to Japan for repairs.

References

See also
 Planning Areas of Singapore

 
East Region, Singapore